Jonathan Ruru (born 2 February 1993) is a New Zealand rugby union player who plays for the  in the Super Rugby competition.  His position of choice is scrum-half. He is the younger brother of  player Michael Ruru.
Ruru has represented the New Zealand Maori All Blacks and The All Black Sevens Teams. He now play in Provence rugby.

A Hawkes Bay product, Ruru was ranked No 4 in his province in 2015, before finding an opportunity in an injury-hit Otago team in 2016 where he became a regular halfback in the Mitre 10 Cup.

He also earned a trial for the New Zealand Sevens, making the squad for two tournaments in 2016. He continued as a regular in 2017 impressing to earn a contract with the Blues, following his older brother who played for the Western Force. Ruru's form in the Mitre 10 Cup earned him a contract with the Blues and he has also been selected for the New Zealand Maori All Blacks.

References 

New Zealand rugby union players
1993 births
Living people
Māori All Blacks players
Ngāti Rongomaiwahine people
Ngāti Kahungunu people
New Zealand international rugby sevens players
Hawke's Bay rugby union players
Otago rugby union players
Auckland rugby union players
Blues (Super Rugby) players
Rugby union scrum-halves
People from Napier, New Zealand
People educated at Napier Boys' High School
Provence Rugby players